Mahanama was King of Anuradhapura in the 5th century, whose reign lasted from 412 to 434. He succeeded his brother Upatissa I as King of Anuradhapura and was succeeded by his son Soththisena.

According to the chronicles at first, this Mahanama was a monk and had an illicit relationship with the queen of Upathissa I. Then with the help of the queen he killed Upathissa and become king while placing the Queen of King Upathissa as his queen too. Anyway, after being king he has deeply devoted himself to Buddhism.

During his time Abhayagiriya Monastery complex had become a larger wider and more powerful monastery than any other monastery in the country. As the guardian of the Tooth Relic of Lord Buddha, it becomes famous worldwide. With the environment of different ideas and different viewpoints, it transforms into semi university state and becomes a placement for keeping a thousand types of Buddhist scripture. Not only Buddhist scripture but it also was kept other knowledge in their too. So this is the very reason many foreign students came to Sri Lanka to study here. Not only Buddhist monks worldwide especially in India, and the Southeast Asian region countries, China and also normal scholars had the opportunity to study that knowledge.

So during his reign, there came special foreign travellers to Lanka and among those most, were Buddhist monks.

The first one was, a famous traveller Faxian who came to Lanka in A.D.410 and lived two years in Abhayagiriya viharaya. According to his records at that time there were 3000 monks residents in the Maha Vihara monastery complex while the Abhayagiriya monastery complex could host residents for 5000 monks. As well as Abhayagiriya had become guardians of the Tooth relic, Bowl relic and Heir relic of Lord Buddha. As well as he said was saw the worship of Tooth Relic was held for a total of 90 days with the participation of thousands of civilians which was held in a special building made in the Abhayagiri monastery complex area. During his living time in the country he was taken Vinaya Pitaka (discipline system)of Mahinsashak (School) and Dirgagama and Samyukthagama sutras from this monastery and taken to China.

The second important traveller was Gunavarman who was a Buddhist scholar and prince of Kashmir and also came to Abhayagiriya. Then he travelled to Java and successfully converted the Dowager queen and King in that country into Buddhism. After that, he guided a group of monks and Bhikkhunis (female monks ) to Nanjing in China. This Bhikkuni group was led by Bhikkuni Devasara Thisarana (Tie-se-ra) and that happened in two steps. The First 8 bhikkhunis were sent to Nanjing(That time Jiankang) which was Capital of Liu Song  under the captainship of sailor Nanda and he came back with a message of insufficient bhikkhunis to perform dual ordination ( this process was required for female monks to become Bhikkhunis under ordination of bhikkus.).Then Lanka sent another Bhikkuni group with 10 to China, while that previous group was proficient in the Chinese language and tradition. So with that, there was successfully delivered Bhikkuni Upasampada to China with the dedication of Gunavarman and the group came from Sri Lanka.

At the same time bhikkuni Chandramali was led another bhikkuni group to Tibet and was translated six Sanskrit text to Tibet which was including Tibetan thripitaka called as Kanjur. 

Anyway, Maha Vihara also did not lose its renowned name worldwide during this time and kept it. But compared to Abhayagihira it was less than Abhayagihira's fame. During his time a monk named Buddhaghosa who was studied under Revatha thero in Maha Bodhi Vihara in India and learned Dhamma Pitaka under Thero  Sanghapala in Mahavihara and Vinaya Pitaka under thero Bhuddhamitha who lived in a vihara sponsored by a lord called Mahanigasami which located south direction of Secret tree of Lord Buddha in Anuradhapura. For checking his knowledge Theros in Maha Vihara was assigned for making a book that simplifies deep meanings in Buddhism and created the marvellous book called Vishuddhimagga Sannaya as a result. Not only that he translated much scripture that was written in the local language in Pali language. However, some folklore said that during that period was burned thousands of books that are written in the local language about different fields. 
Also, king Mahanama made several temples during his period. From those "Lohodora",  "Ralagamuwa", and "Kempasa" temples were donated to Abhayagiri monks and a temple build on Dumrak hill which memorandum of his queen was given to Maha Vihara.
Also during his time there were happened letter exchanges between Lanka and China royal courts.

See also
 List of Sri Lankan monarchs
 History of Sri Lanka

References

External links
 Kings & Rulers of Sri Lanka
 Codrington's Short History of Ceylon

Monarchs of Anuradhapura
M
M
M